Amanda Simeão (born 2 June 1994) is a Brazilian épée fencer who won a team bronze medal at the 2015 Pan American Games. She qualified in the individual and team épée for the 2016 Summer Olympics.

References

1994 births
Living people
Olympic fencers of Brazil
Fencers at the 2016 Summer Olympics
Brazilian female épée fencers
Pan American Games medalists in fencing
Pan American Games bronze medalists for Brazil
Fencers at the 2015 Pan American Games
Medalists at the 2015 Pan American Games
Sportspeople from Curitiba